To Lefty From Willie is the 21st studio album by country singer Willie Nelson. Recorded in 1975, the album sat in the vaults of Columbia Records until 1977. This album is Willie Nelson's tribute to fellow country singer Lefty Frizzell.

Rhapsody praised the album, calling it one of their favorite cover albums.

Track listing 
"Mom and Dad's Waltz" (Lefty Frizzell) – 3:02
"Look What Thoughts Will Do" (Frizzell, Dub Dickerson, Jim Beck) – 2:42
"I Love You a Thousand Ways" (Frizzell, Beck) – 2:59
"Always Late (with Your Kisses)" (Frizzell, Blackie Crawford) – 2:25
"I Want to Be with You Always" (Frizzell, Beck) – 2:39
"She's Gone, Gone, Gone" (Harlan Howard) – 2:31
"A Little Unfair" (Chuck Howard, Hank Cochran) – 3:42
"I Never Go Around Mirrors" (Frizzell, Sanger D. Shafer) – 2:34
"That's the Way Love Goes" (Frizzell, Shafer) – 3:11
"Railroad Lady" (Jerry Jeff Walker, Jimmy Buffett) – 2:39

2003 bonus track
"If You've Got the Money I've Got the Time" (Frizzell, Beck) – 1:39

Personnel 
Willie Nelson – guitar, vocals
Jody Payne – guitar
Bee Spears – bass
Bobbie Nelson – piano
Rex Ludwig – drums
Paul English – drums
Mickey Raphael – harmonica

References

1977 albums
Willie Nelson albums
Tribute albums
Columbia Records albums